Kjell Ivar Lundemoen (born 23 September 1972) is a Norwegian freestyle swimmer. He was born in Kristiansand. He competed at the 1992 Summer Olympics in Barcelona. He won a total of eleven gold medals at the Norwegian championships.

References

External links

1972 births
Living people
Sportspeople from Kristiansand
Norwegian male freestyle swimmers
Olympic swimmers of Norway
Swimmers at the 1992 Summer Olympics
20th-century Norwegian people